A remote starter is a radio controlled device, which is installed in a vehicle by the factory or an aftermarket installer to preheat or cool the vehicle before the owner gets into it.  Once activated, by pushing a button on a special key chain remote, it starts the vehicle automatically for a predetermined time.  Different models have keyless entry as well.  Most newer vehicles need some kind of bypass module to bypass the factory anti-theft system, so the vehicle can be started without the ignition key in the ignition, this is bypassed only to start the vehicle, which after it is running returns to its original state.  For cars with manual transmission additional safety features may need to be added to prevent the car from starting while it's parked in gear.  Having a remote starter installed in a vehicle will usually not void the factory warranty when installed properly.

The first manufacturer to introduce remote start bypass modules to bypass vehicle anti-theft systems was Fortin auto radio based in Montreal, Quebec (Canada). By 1985 multiple manufacturers began producing the devices and automobile manufacturers began offering the remote start devices as an option.  

Newer cars with pushbutton starts can also be interfaced, but some do not have a "take over" procedure.

References 

Auto parts